The term legislative motion has different meanings in different legislatures, and may refer to:

Bill (proposed law)
Motion (parliamentary procedure)
Private member's bill